Astreptorhachis is an extinct genus of Late Carboniferous dissorophoid temnospondyl within the family Dissorophidae. It is known only from one species, Astreptorhachis ohioensis, that was collected from Jefferson County, Ohio by the Ohio Geological Survey in 1953 and described by Peter Vaughn in 1971. The holotype and only known specimen consists of a few neural spines and is currently reposited in the Smithsonian Museum of Natural History. The genus name derives from the Greek words astreptos ("inflexible") and rhachis ("backbone"). The specimen was recognized as being similar to the dissorophid Platyhystrix rugosus from the southwestern United States in have greatly elongate neural spines. Astreptorhachis is differentiated from Platyhystrix by the fusion of successive neural spines and the extensively developed tubercles that cover the external surfaces. It is speculated that the elongation of the spines served to stiffen the backbone, being advantageous for terrestrial locomotion, but the purpose of the fusion of successive spines remained unclear in the absence of other material of this taxon.

See also
 Prehistoric amphibian
 List of prehistoric amphibians

References 

Dissorophids
Carboniferous amphibians
Prehistoric amphibian genera